This is a list of Japanese actors who have their own Wikipedia articles.

Note: All names must be written in standard [given name] + [family name] order and arranged in alphabetical order by family name.

A
Hiroshi Abe
Tsuyoshi Abe
Osamu Adachi
Hiroki Aiba
Masaki Aiba
Kazuyuki Aijima
Show Aikawa
Jin Akanishi
Eiji Akaso
Kousei Amano
Kenji Anan
Masanobu Andō
Sota Aoyama
Hirofumi Arai
Hirofumi Araki
Tadanobu Asano
Kai Atō
Kiyoshi Atsumi
Gō Ayano

B
Daisuke Ban
Eiji Bandō
Bandō Mitsugorō X 
Bunta Sugawara

C
Yudai Chiba
Sonny Chiba (Shinichi Chiba)

D
Sandayū Dokumamushi
Koichi Domoto
Tsuyoshi Domoto

E
Yōsuke Eguchi
Eita
Kenichi Endō
Yuya Endo
Ken'ichi Enomoto

F
Tatsuya Fuji
Takahiro Fujimoto
Hiroshi Fujioka
Makoto Fujita
Tatsuya Fujiwara
Mitsuru Fukikoshi
Sota Fukushi
Masaharu Fukuyama
Yuki Furukawa
Yūta Furukawa
Akira Fuse

H
Takashi Hagino
Masato Hagiwara
Tatsuomi Hamada
Yoshio Harada
Kento Hayashi
Masahiro Higashide
Hideo Higashikokubaru (stage name: Sonomanma Higashi)
Hiroaki Hirata
Takahiro Hōjō
Kanata Hongō
Kei Horie
Masami Horiuchi
Shigeki Hosokawa
Hyde (Hideto Takarai)

I
Ichikawa Raizō VIII
Utaemon Ichikawa
Hiroki Iijima
Chosuke Ikariya
Ryō Ikebe
Sosuke Ikematsu
Toma Ikuta
Yu Inaba
Atsuhiro Inukai
Tatsuya Isaka
Yūsuke Iseya
Renji Ishibashi
Ryo Ishibashi
Takuya Ishida
Yujiro Ishihara
Saburo Ishikura
Asahi Ito
Atsushi Itō
Hayato Ichihara
Hayato Isomura
Arata Iura
Shigeru Izumiya

K
Takeshi Kaga
Teruyuki Kagawa
Shouma Kai
Masaki Kaji
Kenta Kamakari
Kazuya Kamenashi
Yusuke Kamiji
Ryunosuke Kamiki
Ryuji Kamiyama
Jun Kaname
Takeshi Kaneshiro
Mitsuru Karahashi
Toshiaki Karasawa
Ryo Kase
Chiezō Kataoka
Tsurutaro Kataoka
Kento Kaku 
Go Kato
Kazuki Kato
Keisuke Katō
Shingo Katori
Shintaro Katsu
Ryo Katsuji
Morio Kazama
Takuya Kimura
Tatsunari Kimura
Yorozuya Kinnosuke
Renn Kiriyama
Yūji Kishi
Shin Kishida
Eiki Kitamura
Takumi Kitamura
Takeshi Kitano
Taiko Katono
Akira Kobayashi
Kaoru Kobayashi
Keiju Kobayashi
Kiyoshi Kobayashi
Masahiro Kobayashi
Nenji Kobayashi
Teppei Koike
Masahiko Kondō
Yuta Koseki
Kane Kosugi
Yoshikazu Kotani
Shin Koyamada
Koyuki
Kengo Kora
Yōsuke Kubozuka
Masataka Kubota
Yasuaki Kurata

M
Mackenyu
Keita Machida
Gordon Maeda
Goki Maeda
Fuyukichi Maki
Mako (Makoto Iwamatsu)
Shotaro Mamiya
Maruse Taro 
Takahisa Masuda
Kenji Matsuda
Ryuhei Matsuda
Shota Matsuda
Yūsaku Matsuda
Ken Matsudaira
Tori Matsuzaka
Hiroki Matsukata
Naruki Matsukawa
Hiroya Matsumoto
Jun Matsumoto
Takashi Matsuo
Yuya Matsushita
Shinnosuke Mitsushima
Kenichi Matsuyama
Takashi Matsuyama
Toshiro Mifune
Kensei Mikami
Kōji Mitsui
Akifumi Miura
Haruma Miura
Tomokazu Miura
Seiji Miyaguchi
Yuya Miyashita
Hiroshi Miyauchi
Miyavi
Hio Miyazawa
Atomu Mizuishi
Hiro Mizushima
Ryoji Morimoto
Hisaya Morishige
Mirai Moriyama
Masahiro Motoki
Hiroaki Murakami
Nijiro Murakami
Kanako Miyamoto

N
Masatoshi Nagase
Akira Nagata
Kento Nagayama
Takashi Nagayama
Tatsuya Nakadai
Taishi Nakagawa
Kiichi Nakai
Masahiro Nakai
Masaki Nakao
Taiga Nakano
Yuto Nakajima
Yuichi Nakamaru
Atsuo Nakamura
Katsuo Nakamura
Masatoshi Nakamura
Tomoya Nakamura
Yūichi Nakamura
Ichirō Nakatani
Hiroki Narimiya
Mikio Narita
Ryo Narita
Kazunari Ninomiya
Toshiyuki Nishida
Shun Nishime
Hidetoshi Nishijima
Ryo Nishikido
Masahiko Nishimura
Shunsuke Nishikawa
Shūhei Nomura

O
Yūji Oda
Ryohei Odai
Joe Odagiri
Ken Ogata
Yuuki Ogoe
Shun Oguri
Kengo Ohkuchi
Satoshi Ohno
Yo Oizumi
Masi Oka
Masaki Okada
Masumi Okada
Amane Okayama
Masaya Oki
Denjirō Ōkōchi
So Okuno
Hiroyuki Onoue
Takao Osawa
Shugo Oshinari
Ren Osugi
Hideji Ōtaki

R
Chishū Ryū
Ryo Ryusei

S
Kippei Shiina
Tetsurō Sagawa
Takumi Saitoh
Kentaro Sakaguchi
Tak Sakaguchi
Masato Sakai
Sho Sakurai
Dori Sakurada
Hiroyuki Sanada
Hiroyuki Sanada
Takashi Sasano
Jiro Sato
Kōichi Satō
Yuki Sato
Takeru Satoh
Kenta Satoi
Taichi Saotome
Kōtarō Satomi
Tetsu Sawaki
Ikki Sawamura
Koreya Senda
Kōji Seto
Toshiki Seto
Jouji Shibue
Shunya Shiraishi
Shirō Shimomoto
Takashi Shimura
Akihisa Shiono
Jun Shison
Yu Shirota
Joe Shishido
Takashi Sorimachi
Masaki Suda
Kenta Suga
Takamasa Suga
Ryōtarō Sugi
Hiroki Suzuki 
Hiroki Suzuki
Yosuke Sugino

T
Tomorowo Taguchi
Manpei Takagi
Shinpei Takagi 
Shinpei Takagi 
Fumiya Takahashi
Hideki Takahashi
Ryuki Takahashi
Yuya Takaki
Ken Takakura
Shiho Takano
Sousuke Takaoka
Masahiro Takashima
Masanobu Takashima
Kaku Takashina
Mahiro Takasugi
Kouhei Takeda
Tetsuya Takeda
Naoto Takenaka
Yutaka Takenouchi
Ryoma Takeuchi
Hideaki Takizawa
Hiroshi Tamaki
Tetsuji Tamayama
Tetsurō Tamba
Yoshitaka Tamba
Masakazu Tamura
Takahiro Tamura
Ryō Tamura
Seiichi Tanabe
Kei Tanaka
Koki Tanaka
Kunie Tanaka
Min Tanaka
Minoru Tanaka
Hayato Tani
Kei Tani
Shōsuke Tanihara
Yuya Tegoshi
Susumu Terajima
Hidenori Tokuyama
Eijirō Tōno
Etsushi Toyokawa
Junki Tozuka
Takayuki Tsubaki
Kanji Tsuda
Kenjiro Tsuda
Keito Tsuna
Masahiko Tsugawa
Shinya Tsukamoto
Masane Tsukayama
Satoshi Tsumabuki
Shingo Tsurumi
Takeshi Tsuruno
Shinichi Tsutsumi
Shigeru Tsuyuguchi

U
Asahi Uchida
Masato Uchiyama
Tatsuya Ueda
Hitoshi Ueki
Shuhei Uesugi
Seishū Uragami

W
Gō Wakabayashi
Tomisaburo Wakayama
Ken Watanabe
Shu Watanabe
Tetsuya Watari
Tsunehiko Watase
Eiji Wentz

Y
Yūya Yagira
Kōji Yakusho
Keaton Yamada
Takayuki Yamada
Yūki Yamada 
Kōichi Yamadera
Shogo Yamaguchi
Kazuhiro Yamaji
Koji Yamamoto
Tarō Yamamoto
Ryosuke Yamamoto
Ken Yamamura
So Yamamura
Tomohisa Yamashita
Kento Yamazaki
Tsutomu Yamazaki
Kotaro Yanagi
Tomo Yanagishita
Norito Yashima
Ryusei Yokohama
Ryo Yokoyama
Kōsuke Yonehara
Hidetaka Yoshioka
Ryo Yoshizawa
Tomohisa Yuge
Kousei Yuki

Z
Konparu Zenchiku
Konparu Zenpō

See also
List of Japanese actresses

Japanese actors
List
Actors
Japanese